Oceanic is an unincorporated settlement at the southern tip of Smith Island in the area of the Skeena estuary on the North Coast of British Columbia, Canada.

See also
List of settlements in British Columbia

References

North Coast of British Columbia
Unincorporated settlements in British Columbia